Solariella antarctica is a species of sea snail, a marine gastropod mollusk in the family Solariellidae.

Description
The size of the shell attains 6 mm.

Distribution
This species occurs in Antarctic waters.

References

 Engl W. (2012) Shells of Antarctica. Hackenheim: Conchbooks. 402 pp.

External links
 

antarctica
Gastropods described in 1957
Fauna of Antarctica